Patricio Felipe Jerez Aguayo (born 29 June 1987) is a Chilean footballer who currently plays for Chilean Primera B side Fernández Vial.

Career
In May 2021, he joined Fernández Vial in the Primera B de Chile.

Honours
Cobresal
 Primera División (1): 2015 Clausura

References

External links
 

1987 births
Living people
People from Concepción, Chile
People from Concepción Province, Chile
People from Biobío Region
Chilean footballers
C.D. Huachipato footballers
Deportes Valdivia footballers
Trasandino footballers
Deportes Iberia footballers
Deportes Concepción (Chile) footballers
Cobresal footballers
Deportes Temuco footballers
C.D. Arturo Fernández Vial footballers
Chilean Primera División players
Primera B de Chile players
Segunda División Profesional de Chile players
Sportspeople from Concepción, Chile
Association football defenders
21st-century Chilean people